Rabk (also Romanized as Rābk) is a village in Kangan Rural District, in the Central District of Jask County, Hormozgan Province, Iran. At the 2006 census, its population was 16, in 5 families.

References 

Populated places in Jask County